Henderson Edward Wright (May 15, 1919 – November 19, 1995) was an American professional baseball pitcher. He played all or part of five seasons in Major League Baseball between 1945 and 1952 for the Boston Braves (1945–48) and Philadelphia Athletics (1952). He was born in Dyersburg, Tennessee.

Wright began his professional career in 1940 in the minor leagues. In 1945, he threw a no-hitter in the American Association while pitching for the Indianapolis Indians, and later that season was traded to the Braves for Ira Hutchinson and Steve Shemo. He made his major league debut on July 29.

During the 1946 season, his first full season in the majors, Wright finished 10th in the National League with a .571 winning percentage (a 12–9 win–loss record). After going 3–3 with a 6.40 ERA in 1947, Wright spent most of 1948 with the minor league Milwaukee Brewers, then was sent to the Philadelphia Phillies. He bounced around the minor leagues for the next several seasons, from the Phillies to the New York Giants and finally to the Athletics. In between, he pitched the first shutout in Caribbean Series history in 1949. After his return to the majors in 1952, he returned to the minors until 1954 before retiring.

In a five-season career, Wright posted a 25–16 record with 93 strikeouts and a 4.00 ERA in 101 appearances, including 39 starts, 16 complete games, three shutouts, one save, and 398 innings of work.

Wright died of cancer in his hometown of Dyersburg, Tennessee, at age 76, on November 19, 1995.

References

External links

Baseball Library
Retrosheet

Major League Baseball pitchers
Boston Braves players
Philadelphia Athletics players
Jackson Generals (KITTY League) players
Jonesboro White Sox players
Paducah Indians players
Memphis Chickasaws players
Greenville Buckshots players
Meridian Eagles players
Atlanta Crackers players
Norfolk Tars players
Indianapolis Indians players
Milwaukee Brewers (minor league) players
Toronto Maple Leafs (International League) players
Minneapolis Millers (baseball) players
Ottawa Giants players
Hopkinsville Hoppers players
Chattanooga Lookouts players
Lincoln Chiefs players
Baseball players from Tennessee
People from Dyersburg, Tennessee
Deaths from cancer in Tennessee
1919 births
1995 deaths